Peter John Andrew Frain (born 18 March 1965) is an English former professional footballer who played as a striker in the Football League for Mansfield Town. After retiring as a player he took up management, most recently as manager of Midland Football Combination Premier Division side Bolehall Swifts.

Playing career
Frain spent five years with West Bromwich Albion, during which time he played four times for the England under-18 team. He played twice in the Third Division of the Football League while on loan to Mansfield Town, but never appeared for his owning club. He went on to play in the Faroe Islands and in English non-League football.

Management career
After retiring as a player Frain became a manager, first with Knowle, and then in joint charge of Alvechurch alongside Paul Busst until the pair left the club in September 2009. The next month Frain was appointed manager of Midland Football Combination Premier Division club Highgate United. In his second season with the club they finished third, going one place better in 2007–08 and earning promotion to the Midland Football Alliance. Frain left the club in late 2008 for work-related reasons, but returned only two weeks later. After a mid-table finish preceded a poor start to the 2009–10 season, Frain was sacked in September 2009. In January 2010, Frain returned to the Midland Combination as manager of Premier Division side Bolehall Swifts. After helping the club to an 18th-place finish in the Midland Football Combination Premier Division, Frain was replaced as manager in July 2010.

Personal life
In 2008, Frain was working as a logistics manager. He is the brother of former Birmingham City and Northampton Town footballer John Frain.

References

1965 births
Living people
Footballers from Birmingham, West Midlands
English footballers
Association football forwards
West Bromwich Albion F.C. players
Mansfield Town F.C. players
English football managers
Alvechurch F.C. managers
Knowle F.C. managers
Highgate United F.C. managers
Bolehall Swifts F.C. managers